Timothy John Guy Whitmarsh,  (born 23 January 1970) is a British classicist and Regius Professor of Greek at the University of Cambridge. He is best known for his work on the Greek literary culture of the Roman Empire, especially the Second Sophistic and the ancient Greek novel.

Early life and education
Whitmarsh was born on 23 January 1970 in Chelmsford, Essex, England. He was educated at Moor Park School, a Catholic prep school near Ludlow, and at Malvern College, then an all-boys private school. He took his undergraduate degree and doctorate at the University of Cambridge.

Academic career
From 2001 to 2007 he taught in the department of Classics and Ancient History at the University of Exeter where he remains an honorary fellow. He then served as E. P. Warren Praelector, Fellow and Tutor in Greek at Corpus Christi College, Oxford, and Professor of Ancient Literatures at the University of Oxford.

In October 2014, he succeeded Paul Cartledge as the A. G. Leventis Professor of Greek Culture at the University of Cambridge. In 2023, he became Regius Professor of Greek in the same university, succeeding Richard Hunter.

Classics Confidential
Whitmarsh appears in the Classics Confidential series in conversation with various classical scholars:
Exploring Abrahamic Religions—in conversation with Guy Stroumsa, 30 July 2013
The Philosophy of Ancient Atheism—in conversation with David Sedley, 9 August 2013
Monotheism, Disbelief and the Hebrew Bible—in conversation with Francesca Stavrakopoulou, 20 September 2013
 Socrates on Trial—in conversation with Bettany Hughes, 30 September 2013

Publications 
His publications include Greek Literature and the Roman Empire: The Politics of Imitation, Ancient Greek Literature, The Second Sophistic, and Narrative and Identity in the Ancient Greek Novel: Returning Romance, Beyond the Second Sophistic: Adventures in Greek Postclassicism.

Dirty Love: The Genealogy of the Ancient Greek Novel. Oxford: Oxford University Press, 2018.
Battling the Gods: Atheism in the Ancient World, Faber & Faber, 2016

References

Living people
British classical scholars
Fellows of Corpus Christi College, Oxford
Fellows of St John's College, Cambridge
Classical scholars of the University of Oxford
Scholars of ancient Greek literature
Members of the University of Cambridge faculty of classics
Classical scholars of the University of Exeter
1970 births
People educated at Malvern College
Professors of the University of Cambridge